Epimorius is a genus of snout moths. It was described by Philipp Christoph Zeller in 1877.

Species
 Epimorius caribellus Ferguson, 1991
 Epimorius cymonia (Schaus, 1913)
 Epimorius maylinae Solis, 2003
 Epimorius prodigiosa Whalley, 1964
 Epimorius suffusus (Zeller, 1877)
 Epimorius testaceellus Ragonot, 1887

References

Tirathabini
Pyralidae genera